× Degarmoara, abbreviated Dgmra. in the horticultural trade, is the nothogenus comprising intergeneric hybrids between the orchid genera Brassia, Miltonia and Odontoglossum (Brs. x Milt. x Odm.).

In the current botanical classifications according to Genera Orchidacearum by Alec M. Pridgeon, Phillip J. Cribb, Mark W. Chase, and Finn N. Rasmussen, Odontoglossum is merged into Oncidium and x Degarmoara is considered to be the same as the nothogenus × Aliceara. The RHS Orchid register does not register Degarmoara anymore.

References

Orchid nothogenera
Oncidiinae
Historically recognized angiosperm taxa